To the Memory of Mr. Oldham (1684) is an elegy written by John Dryden (1631–1700), commemorating the death of the poet John Oldham.

Poem

Summary
"In this elegy, John Dryden laments the death of John Oldham (1653–1683), the young poet whose Satires upon the Jesuits (1681), which Dryden admired, were written in 1679, before Dryden's major satires appeared (see line 8)." Dryden laments that he has made Oldham's acquaintance much too late and that Oldham died much too young. Their poetry and their thinking (i.e. their souls) were very similar ("For sure our souls were near allied, and thine / Cast in the same poetic mold with mine."). They both disliked "knaves and fools" which are "[o]bjects of satire." They both had the same goals. Oldham is compared to Nisus, who "on the point of winning a footrace, slipped in a pool of blood" in Vergil's Aeneid. Dryden then asks how Oldham's "to thy abundant store / What could advancing age have added more?" and is sure that his verse could have been perfected, but this would not have been required as "satire needs not those [perfect metrics], and wit will shine / Through the harsh cadence of a rugged line." Here, "Dryden repeats the Renaissance idea that the satirist should avoid smoothness and affect rough meters […]." Moreover, Dryden points out that this would be "A noble error, and but seldom made, / When poets are by too much force betrayed." As Oldham was still young his "generous fruit […] / Still showed a quickness," but Dryden finds comfort in the fact that "maturing time / But mellows what we write to the dull sweets of rhyme." The poem is concluded with an echo of "the famous words that conclude Catullus's elegy to his brother: 'Atque in perpetuum, frater, ave atque vale' (And forever, brother, hail and farewell!)." Marcellus, who is mentioned in line 23, is "[t]he nephew of Augustus, adopted by him as his successor. After winning military fame as a youth, [Marcellus] died at the age of twenty".

Notes

Further reading
 Abrams. M.H. "Elegy." A Glossary of Literary Terms. 8th edition. Boston: Thomson Wadsworth, 2005. 76–78.
 Greenblatt, Stephen et al. "John Dryden." The Norton Anthology of English Literature. Ed. Stephen Greenblatt et al. Vol. 1. 8th ed. New York, London: Norton, 2006. 2083–2084.
 Sanders, Andrew. "The Poetry of the Restoration Period: Rochester and Dryden." The Short Oxford History of English Literature. 3rd ed. Oxford: Oxford University Press, 2004. 256–264.

1680s poems
Poetry by John Dryden